Uga Samweli Okpara (born 28 August 1982) is a Nigerian football player.

Career
Okpara began his career with Enyimba International F.C. and was an import member of the team that won the 2002 and 2003 African Champions Leagues. On 15 October 2009, he left Enyimba International F.C. and joined Indian I-League team East Bengal. He became the rock solid defender for the Red and Gold in I-League, Fed Cup and the AFC Cup as well. He was voted as the best defender in 2012-13 season

Statistics

International career
For two years, Okpara was the Vice Captain of the Nigeria national beach soccer team and represented the team at FIFA Beach Soccer World Cup 2005 and 2007.

Honours

Club

Enyimba International F.C.

Nigerian Premier League: 2002, 2003, 2005, 2007
Nigerian FA Cup: 2005
Nigerian Super Cup: 2003
CAF Champions League: 2003, 2004
CAF Super Cup: 2004, 2005

East Bengal F.C.

Federation Cup: 2009–10, 2010, 2012
Super Cup: 2011
IFA Shield: 2012
Calcutta Football League: 2010, 2011, 2012, 2013

References

1982 births
Living people
Nigerian footballers
Association football defenders
Enyimba F.C. players
East Bengal Club players
Expatriate footballers in India
Nigerian expatriate sportspeople in India
I-League players
Nigerian beach soccer players